Sarah Walker may refer to:

Sarah Walker (Australian author) (born 1965), Australian author
Sarah Walker (badminton) (born 1989), English badminton player
Sarah Walker (Brothers & Sisters), a character in the television series Brothers & Sisters
Sarah Walker (BMX rider) (born 1988), BMX bike racer from New Zealand
Sarah Walker (Chuck), a character on the American television show Chuck
Sarah Walker (music broadcaster) (born c. 1965/66), BBC classical music presenter
Sarah Walker (mezzo-soprano) (born 1943), British mezzo-soprano singer
Sarah Walker (television presenter) (born 1974), British presenter of the To Buy or Not to Buy television programme
Sarah Woodruff Walker (1814–1879), wife of Supreme Court justice David Davis
Madam C. J. Walker (Sarah Breedlove, 1867–1919), American businesswoman